The nobility of the Republic of Ragusa included patrician families, most of which originated from the City of Dubrovnik, and some coming from other, mostly neighbouring, countries.

The Republic of Ragusa was ruled by a strict patriciate that was formally established in 1332, which was subsequently modified only once, following the 1667 Dubrovnik earthquake.

Families

 Basiljević 
 Benessa 
 Binciola 
 Bobali 
 Bocignolo 
 Bodazza
 Bona 
 Bonda 
 Božidarević 
 Buća 
 Cerva 
 Giorgi 
 Ghetaldi 
 Gradić 
 Gučetić 
 Gundulić 
 Kaboga 
 Calich 
 Klašić 
 Crasso
 Croce
 Giuriceo
 Gleda
 Lukarić 
 Martinussio 
 Menčetić 
 Mlaschagna 
 Natali
 Palmotić 
 Pavlić
 Proculi
 Prodanelli 
 Pucić 
 Radagli 
 Ranjina 
 Resti
 Saraca 
 Sorgo 
 Tudisi 
 Vodopić
 Volcasso 
 Zamagna 
 Zlatarić

See also

Patrician (post-Roman Europe)

References